Colquitt County Courthouse is an historic government building constructed in 1902 and located at Courthouse Square in Moultrie, Georgia, the seat of Colquitt County.

The present Colquitt County Courthouse is the third courthouse to serve Colquitt County.

It was added to the National Register of Historic Places on September 18, 1980.

See also
Moultrie, Georgia
Colquitt County, Georgia

References

Courthouses on the National Register of Historic Places in Georgia (U.S. state)
County courthouses in Georgia (U.S. state)
Clock towers in Georgia (U.S. state)
Buildings and structures in Colquitt County, Georgia
National Register of Historic Places in Colquitt County, Georgia
Individually listed contributing properties to historic districts on the National Register in Georgia (U.S. state)
1902 establishments in Georgia (U.S. state)
Government buildings completed in 1902